The area code 671 is the local telephone area code of the United States territory of Guam. It was created with the beginning of permissive dialing on July 1, 1997, replacing Guam's previous International Telecommunication Union country code 671 at the end of permissive dialing on July 1, 1998.

Origins
Prior to 1997, callers from the rest of the United States had to dial '011-671' and then the seven-digit telephone number to reach Guam, similar to international calls. As international calling rates began to fall in the more competitive destination countries during the 1990s, it became a considerable financial burden for people on the United States mainland to place calls to the United States territory of Guam, especially for those who were stationed in United States military bases there.

Calling costs
After Guam was added to the North American Numbering Plan, the Federal Communications Commission (FCC) regulated calls to and from Guam as "domestic", hence dramatically lowering the cost of these telephone calls. This change also opened up national toll-free numbers (as of April 2015, area codes 800, 888, 877, 866, 855 and 844) to callers from Guam, which became very popular with the advent of prepaid phone cards.

However, since no U.S. national mobile telephone carriers have a presence on Guam, cellular calls into Guam are not necessarily considered "domestic" or within the definition of "nationwide long distance".

The FCC's regulation of Guam as "domestic" has no legal effect for telephone carriers outside the United States, for whom Guam is often not a competitive destination. Therefore, calls from other countries inbound to Guam can still be relatively expensive, especially compared to outbound calls from Guam since Guam is now open to the U.S.-based phone card market through toll-free access.

Dialing
Prior to 2021, within Guam, only the seven-digit phone number was necessary. When a person in Guam calls anywhere in the United States or Canada, one simply dials "1" and then the area code and phone number. For callers in the U.S. or Canada calling to Guam, one first dials '1-671', followed by the seven-digit phone number.

On October 24, 2021, area code 671 was transitioned to ten-digit dialing, despite not being part of an overlay numbering plan, in which multiple area codes are assigned to a numbering plan area. The area code had telephone numbers assigned for the central office code 988. In 2020, 988 was designated nationwide as a dialing code for the National Suicide Prevention Lifeline, which created a conflict for exchanges that still permitted seven-digit dialing.

Prefixes
With a population of less than 200,000, there is only a limited need for prefixes on Guam. Currently, less than 165 of the 800 possibilities are actually in use.

Here is a list of landline prefixes on Guam and their associated geographic locations:
3XX: U.S. Military
47X: Hagåtña, Agana Heights, Asan-Maina, Piti, Chalan-Pago-Ordot, Mongmong-Toto-Maite
56X: Agat, Santa Rita
63X: Dededo
64X: Tamuning
65X: Yigo
73X: Mangilao, Barrigada
789: Yona, Talofofo
828: Merizo, Inarajan, Umatac
969: DoCoMo Pacific subscribers

See also
 List of NANP area codes
 Communications in Guam

References

External links 
 List of exchanges from AreaCodeDownload.com, 671 Area Code

Mass media in Guam
671
Communications in Guam
Telecommunications-related introductions in 1997
1997 establishments in Guam